Jean Gounot (9 April 1894 – 16 January 1978) was a French gymnast and Olympic medalist. He competed at the 1920 Summer Olympics in Antwerp, where he received a bronze medal in all-round individual.

At the 1924 Summer Olympics in Paris he received a silver medal in sidehorse vault, and a silver medal and in team combined exercises.

References

Sources

1894 births
1978 deaths
French male artistic gymnasts
Gymnasts at the 1920 Summer Olympics
Gymnasts at the 1924 Summer Olympics
Gymnasts at the 1928 Summer Olympics
Olympic gymnasts of France
Olympic silver medalists for France
Olympic bronze medalists for France
Olympic medalists in gymnastics
Medalists at the 1924 Summer Olympics
Medalists at the 1920 Summer Olympics
20th-century French people